Leicester Airport  is an aerodrome located to the east of Stoughton, Leicestershire, England, about  east of Leicester City Centre by road. The Leicestershire Aero Club Limited, the airport operator, provide elementary flight training, experience flights and the airport is home to a wide variety of private aircraft. The airfield was constructed in 1942 as part of the former RAF station, RAF Leicester East. The facility was named Stoughton Aerodrome prior to 1974.

The airport has a CAA Ordinary Licence (Number P720) that allows flights for the public transport of passengers or for flying instruction as authorised by the licensee—Leicestershire Aero Club Limited. However, the airport does not currently operate public transport services.

Air Traffic Services, in the form of air-ground communication are provided by "Leicester Radio" on a frequency of 122.130 MHz.

Proposed creation of an Eco-town
The Leicester Mercury reported in January 2008 that plans to build a new eco-town on the site of the airport were under consideration, and on 3 April 2008 it was announced that the Pennbury proposal was one of fifteen sites shortlisted for the next phase of public consultations. However, a more recent report stated the eco-town would be built elsewhere. As of 2022, there are no plans for the renovation of Leicester Airport.

Accidents
In December 2011, a pilot was killed and two others were injured, when two light aircraft collided in mid-air, near the airport.

References

External links

 Leicester Airport
 Leicestershire Aero Club management
 Helicentre Aviation Ltd. (Official Helicopter Operator at Leicester Airport)
 One Leicester
 Video: Leicestershire Aero Club celebrates centenary from BBC Radio Leicester

Airports in England
Transport in Leicestershire
Airports in Leicestershire
Airports in the East Midlands